Xu Huaiji (born 7 May 1989) is a Chinese former footballer.

Career statistics

Club

Notes

References

1989 births
Living people
Chinese footballers
Association football defenders
Singapore Premier League players
Beijing Guoan F.C. players